Victaphanta compacta, common name the Otway black snail, is a species of carnivorous air-breathing land snail, a terrestrial pulmonate gastropod mollusks in the family Rhytididae.
The Otway Black Snail Victaphanta compacta is only found in cool temperate rainforests in the Otway Ranges, Victoria, Australia. It is one of four species of the carnivorous land snails in the genus Victaphanta and is endemic to the Otway Ranges.

The Otway Black Snail was first described as Paryphanta compacta (Cox and Hedley 1912). In 1933 the genus Victaphanta was established (Iredale 1933).

Distribution
This species is endemic to Australia and occurs in the Otway Ranges of Victoria.

Description
The body of the snail is grey-blue to black. The shell is spherical with four whorls and varies from a glossy dark brown to black with varying tinges of yellow-brown on the inner whorl. The shell has a maximum diameter of 28mm and is positioned towards the tail of the body. The shell is thin, light weight and moderately flexible and composed mostly of conchin. The Otway Black Snail can be distinguished from other species of Vicaphanta because of its specific geographic range, globulous shaped shell, lack of an orange frill around its foot and an absence of orange mucus.

The Otway Black Snail is partially nocturnal. It is carnivorous, feasting on other snails, slugs, earthworms and soft bodied insect larvae but is not cannibalistic. It has no jaw as found in herbivorous snails but has long, sharp, backward pointing teeth arranged in v-shaped rows on the radula (underside of the foot of the snail) which hold the prey while it is devoured

References

 Cox, J.C. & Hedley, C. 1912. An index to the land shells of Victoria. Memoirs of the National Museum of Victoria, Melbourne 4: 5-14 pls i-iii
 Iredale, T. 1933. Systematic notes on Australian land shells. Records of the Australian Museum 19: 37-59
 Smith, B.J. 1970. Notes on the anatomy of Victaphanta atramentaria Shuttleworth and V. compacta Cox & Hedley, and the designation of a neotype for V. atramentaria. Journal of the Malacological Society of Australia 2: 13-21
 Smith, B.J. & Kershaw, R.C. 1979. Field Guide to the Non-marine Molluscs of South-eastern Australia. Canberra : A.N.U. Press 285 pp
 Smith, B.J. 1992. Non-Marine Mollusca. In, Houston, W.W.K. (ed.). Zoological Catalogue of Australia. Non-marine Mollusca. Canberra : Australian Government Publishing Service Vol. 8 xii 408 pp.

Otway Black Snail

Endangered fauna of Australia
Rhytididae
Gastropods of Australia
Gastropods described in 1912
Taxonomy articles created by Polbot